Mariner's Temple is a Baptist church at 3 Henry Street, in the Two Bridges section of Manhattan, New York City.  It is a brownstone building with Ionic columns. It is affiliated with the American Baptist Churches USA.

History
The church was established in 1795 as Oliver Street Baptist Church. The building was inaugurated in 1845. Early Swedish Baptist leaders Anders Wiberg and John Alexis Edgren were ordained in the church in 1852 and 1866, respectively. Reverend Dr. Henrietta Carter became pastor in 1998.

Beliefs 
The church has a Baptist confession of faith and is a member of the American Baptist Churches USA.

See also
National Register of Historic Places listings in Manhattan below 14th Street
List of New York City Designated Landmarks in Manhattan below 14th Street

References

External links 

Mariners' Temple Baptist Church
American Memory from the Smithsonian
Early records

Churches in Manhattan
New York City Designated Landmarks in Manhattan
Baptist churches in New York City
Churches completed in 1845
19th-century Baptist churches in the United States
Properties of religious function on the National Register of Historic Places in Manhattan
Chinatown, Manhattan